Restoring the Balance was a satirical radio segment that occasionally appeared on Australian radio station Triple J, which satirically displayed the contrasting political views between the then conservative Australian Howard government, and the majority of the Left wing government-funded Triple J radio station. The premise of the show suggested that the station was forced by the ABC board to broadcast a segment of right wing political views in order to restore the balance. The creators began by conducting satirical interviews with Australian political identities in 2003. The show itself was broadcast sporadically on Sunday afternoons during 2004, and then began as a series broadcasting on 25 February 2007.

Format
The show features the characters of young Liberal Stirling Addison and young National Tom Thomlinson. The pair are played by Julian Schiller and Tony Moclair. They represent the more affluent end of Australian society - Addison from the city, Thomlinson from a farming area.  The characters portrayed on the show are extreme in their views, which has resulted in complaints from callers who do not realise the show is a parody.

The official site lists brief outlines of each of the characters. Addison is a Sydney Grammar Old Boy and his profile includes:
 Baptised into the Anglican Church in 1981 before its sell out to left wing homosexual minority interests.
 Elected Grade 5 student president - remembered for sacking tuck shop mothers for displaying signs of 'unionised' activity.
 Royal Tennis champion 3 years in a row (by default '94/'95, '96 victory still subject of inquiry)
 Winner of the CJ Asquith prize for inter-collegiate oration representing St Andrews College, for speech "Melanie Howard - a life of virtue".

Thom Thomlinson is described as "a simple farm boy at heart", who grew up on his family's 100 000 hectare property in rural Queensland.  Gems from his past include:

 Boarded at Geelong Grammar.
 Last day of school, hijacks bus and drives into boarding school dorm - several students injured but refuse to press charges. In non-related incident, father donates $25 000 to Old Grammarians fund. Bus driver later sacked for reckless endangerment.
 Graduates accelerated degree in Ag Science/Banking at Bond University after failing first year twice. In non-related incident, father donates $25 000 to Bond University's Vice Chancellor’s Fund.

Schiller and Moclair also filled in on Triple J as a one-off in the Sunday morning shift where they appeared as themselves. In August 2004, Schiller and Moclair signed on to do breakfast radio at Nova 91.9, an Adelaide station.

Broadcast
It was announced that from 25 February 2007, Stirling Addison would return to Triple J on Sunday evenings to host a new series of Restoring the Balance (apparently without Thom Thomlinson as a co-host). John Safran, the previous host of this timeslot, has allegedly gone on a 10-week hiatus due to his other media commitments. In character, Stirling insisted that this change was instead approved by the ABC board due to the current segment being "too semitic", and displaying "a lack of traditional right-wing values". Amongst other things, he then went on to approve the taxpayer-funded visit of U.S. Vice President Dick Cheney to Sydney, and stated how "it would be an honour to be shot in the face by the Vice President".

2007 saw the inclusion of Spencer Penrose, a Family First member as co-host (played by Richard Marsland). 

Restoring The Balance made its last appearance on Triple J in a stint airing on Sundays at 9pm, from 24 July until Sept 11, 2011.

References

External links
Restoring the Balance (archive of later webpage)
Restoring the Balance (archive of 2004 webpage)

Triple J programs